The Central District of Khoda Afarin County is in East Azerbaijan province, Iran. At the National Census in 2006, its population (as parts of the former Khoda Afarin District in Kaleybar County) was 10,034 in 2,184 households. The following census in 2011 counted 9,489 people in 2,495 households, by which time Khoda Afarin County had been established. At the latest census in 2016, the district had 8,531 inhabitants in 2,617 households.

References 

Khoda Afarin County

Districts of East Azerbaijan Province

Populated places in East Azerbaijan Province

Populated places in Khoda Afarin County